Phaidon Design Classics is a British three volume set of reference books on industrial design since the 17th century.

It lists 999 objects that the editorial team chose as design classics.

Alan Fletcher was the art director for the project.

References

External links
 www.phaidon.com

2006 non-fiction books
Design books
Industrial design
Product design
British design
British books